Châu Ngọc Quang (born 1 February 1996) is a Vietnamese professional footballer who plays as a midfielder for V.League 1 club Hoàng Anh Gia Lai and the Vietnam national team.

International goals
Scores and results list Vietnam's goal tally first.

Honours
Viettel
V.League 2: 2018
Vietnam
VFF Cup: 2022
 AFF Championship runners-up: 2022

References

External links
 

1996 births
Living people
Vietnamese footballers
Association football defenders
V.League 1 players
Hoang Anh Gia Lai FC players
Haiphong FC players
People from Quảng Nam province